Kenneth Lee Carder (born November 18, 1940) is a retired American bishop of the United Methodist Church, elected in 1992.  Carder distinguished himself as a pastor, a member of Annual Conference and General U.M. agencies, a bishop and an author.

Birth and family
Born in Washington County, Tennessee, Kenneth is one of five children of Allen and Edith Carder.  Ken married Linda Miller June 30, 1961.  She is a graduate of Emory and Henry College. They are the parents of two daughters, Sheri Carder Hood and Sandra Carder Nash, and they have five grandchildren.

Education
Ken graduated with honors from East Tennessee State University in 1962, and from Wesley Theological Seminary in 1965.  In 1980 he earned a Doctor of Ministry Degree from Vanderbilt Divinity School.

Ordained ministry
Ken was ordained deacon in 1963 by Bishop Roy H. Short.  He was ordained elder in 1965 by Bishop H. Ellis Finger, Jr. Prior to his election to the episcopacy, Ken pastored churches in Gaithersburg, Maryland; Bristol, Tennessee; Abingdon, Virginia; and Oak Ridge and Knoxville, Tennessee.   He chaired the Task Force on Genetic Science, which presented its report to the 1992 U.M. General Conference. In addition to dialogue between science and theology, Ken has special concern for prison ministries, racial justice, and ministry with the poor and marginalized.

Ken Carder was a delegate to the South Eastern Jurisdictional Conference of the U.M. Church in 1980.  He was elected General Conference delegate, 1984–92.  He has served in several Annual and General Conference positions, including Chair of the Conference Council on Finance and Administration, a Director of the General Board of Church and Society, and president of the General Board of Discipleship.  He was also a trustee of Emory University, and Henry College, Martin Methodist College, Lambuth University, and Millsaps College, and a member of the Board of Governors of Wesley Seminary.

Episcopal ministry
Bishop Carder was elected to the episcopacy in 1992 by the Southeastern Jurisdictional Conference of the U.M. Church.  At the time he was the pastor of the Church Street U.M.C. in Knoxville.  He was assigned to the Nashville Episcopal Area, effective September 1, 1992.
He was assigned to the Mississippi Area in 2000, where he served until retiring in 2004 and joining the faculty of Duke University Divinity School. 
Currently, Bishop Carder serves as the Ruth W. and A. Morris Williams, Jr. Distinguished Professor Emeritus of the Practice of Christian Ministry Duke Divinity School, Durham, North Carolina. He is the author of six books and numerous articles.

See also
 List of bishops of the United Methodist Church

References
 InfoServ, the official information service of The United Methodist Church.  
 The Council of Bishops of the United Methodist Church 
 United Methodist News Service story:  "Southeastern United Methodists Elect, Assign Bishops," July 20, 1992.

External links
Photo of Bishop Carder

1940 births
Living people
United Methodist bishops of the Southeastern Jurisdiction
East Tennessee State University alumni
Wesley Theological Seminary alumni
Duke University faculty
20th-century Methodist bishops